Stolephorus is a genus of ray-finned fish in the family Engraulidae.

Species
These are the currently recognized species in this genus:
 Stolephorus acinaces Harutaka Hata & Sébastien Lavoué & Motomura, 2020
 Stolephorus advenus Wongratana, 1987 (False Indian anchovy)
 Stolephorus andhraensis Babu Rao, 1966 (Andhra anchovy)
 Stolephorus apiensis (D. S. Jordan & Seale, 1906) (Samoan anchovy)
 Stolephorus baganensis Hardenberg, 1933 (Bagan anchovy)
 Stolephorus brachycephalus Wongratana, 1983 (Broadhead anchovy)
 Stolephorus carpentariae (De Vis, 1882) (Gulf of Carpentaria anchovy)
 Stolephorus chinensis (Günther, 1880) (China anchovy)
 Stolephorus commersonnii Lacépède, 1803 (Commerson's anchovy)
 Stolephorus dubiosus Wongratana, 1983 (Thai anchovy)
 Stolephorus holodon (Boulenger, 1900) (Natal anchovy)
 Stolephorus indicus (van Hasselt, 1823) (Indian anchovy)
 Stolephorus insularis Hardenberg, 1933 (Hardenberg's anchovy)
 Stolephorus multibranchus Wongratana, 1987 (Caroline anchovy)
 Stolephorus nelsoni Wongratana, 1987 (Nelson's anchovy)
 Stolephorus pacificus W. J. Baldwin, 1984 (Pacific anchovy)
 Stolephorus ronquilloi Wongratana, 1983 (Ronquillo's anchovy)
 Stolephorus shantungensis (G. L. Li, 1978)
 Stolephorus teguhi Seishi Kimura, K. Hori & Shibukawa, 2009 (Sulawesi anchovy)
 Stolephorus tri (Bleeker, 1852) (Spined anchovy)
 Stolephorus waitei D. S. Jordan & Seale, 1926 (Spotty-face anchovy)

References

ADW
Tham, A.K., A contribution to the study of the growth of members of the genus Stolephorus Lacépède in Singapore Strait. Proc. IPFC 12(2):1-25. 1967.

External links

 
Marine fish genera
Taxa named by Bernard Germain de Lacépède